Weidenberg is a municipality in the district of Bayreuth in Bavaria in Germany. The Ölschnitz river discharges near Weidenberg-Neunkirchen into the Red Main.

Nearby is the site of a medieval castle, known as Burgstall Schlosshügel.

References

Bayreuth (district)